Rebecca Welles (born Reba Tassell; February 5, 1928 – February 13, 2017) was an American television and film actress.

Early years
Welles was born in Philadelphia, Pennsylvania to Lena (née Schiller and Samuel Tassell. Her only sibling was fashion designer Gustave Tassell. In 1944, she was the recipient of a $500 tuition award from the Theatre Guild to the American Academy of Dramatic Arts. She spent two years at the academy and to act in stock theater in Philadelphia.

As a youngster, she was a member of the Bessie V. Hicks Players in Philadelphia.

Career
Welles' first TV appearance was in the episode "A Chill on the Wind" on Studio One in 1951, where she was credited under her birth name, but subsequently worked under the surname Welles. (A newspaper source in February 1951 says of Welles, "Last November she had a walk-on in the Studio One drama of A Letter to Cairo.)

Active from 1951 to 1964, Welles made appearances on about 50 TV shows, including 77 Sunset Strip, Gunsmoke (S2E33 “Moon”), Boots and Saddles, Bat Masterson, Alcoa Theatre, and four episodes of Alfred Hitchcock Presents. She made five appearances on Perry Mason, including three roles as defendants: in 1959 she played Carol Delaney in "The Case of the Stuttering Bishop", and Carol Taylor in "The Case of the Frantic Flyer." She played Rita Norge in the 1957 episode "The Case of the Runaway Corpse." In her other two appearances, she played the role of murderer Edith Bristol in the 1961 episode "The Case of the Waylaid Wolf" and murderer Leslie Eden in the 1964 episode "The Case of the Illicit Illusion." In addition, Welles appeared in four feature films, including Good Morning, Miss Dove (1955) and Desire Under the Elms (1958). She made her last onscreen appearance in a 1964 episode of Arrest and Trial.

In a reversal of sorts, Welles was the inspiration for an episode of Big Town on CBS. A newspaper article in The Bridgeport Telegram on February 21, 1951, reported "Susan Douglas stars as Miss Cinderella ... which was inspired by the experience of Reba Tassell, the TV Cinderella girl who made such a hit on Studio One last month."

Personal life
Welles married Barton Goldberg in 1946. They had two daughters together, Elizabeth and actress Gwen Welles, before they divorced in 1961. Welles married television director Don Weis on August 25, 1961, in Los Angeles.

Death
Welles died on February 13, 2017, in Santa Fe, New Mexico, eight days after her 89th birthday.

Filmography

References

External links
 
 

1928 births
American film actresses
American television actresses
2017 deaths
Actresses from Philadelphia
People from Chattanooga, Tennessee
21st-century American women
Western (genre) television actors